Sir Frederick Pollock, 3rd Baronet PC, FBA (10 December 1845 – 18 January 1937) was an English jurist best known for his History of English Law before the Time of Edward I, written with F.W. Maitland, and his lifelong correspondence with US Supreme Court Justice Oliver Wendell Holmes. He was a Cambridge Apostle.

Life 
Pollock was the eldest son of William Frederick Pollock, Master of the Court of Exchequer, and Juliet Creed, daughter of the Rev, Harry Creed. He was the grandson of Sir Frederick Pollock, 1st Baronet, Lord Chief Baron of the Exchequer, the great-nephew of Field Marshal Sir George Pollock, 1st Baronet, and the first cousin of Ernest Pollock, 1st Viscount Hanworth, Master of the Rolls.

He was educated at Eton College, where he was a King's Scholar, and Trinity College, Cambridge, where he was elected Fellow in 1868 (later Honorable Fellow in 1920). In 1871 he was admitted to the Bar. He wrote a series of text books that took a new approach to the teaching of English Law including The Principles of Contract at Law and in Equity (1876) and The Law of Torts (1887). 

Rather than relying on specific applications of law these works emphasised underlying principles. They acted as models for future textbooks and helped modernise English legal education. Pollock taught at the University of Oxford (1883–1903), as Corpus Professor of Jurisprudence. He was Professor of Common Law in the Inns of Court (1884–1890). He was Editor of the Law Reports from 1895 to 1935. He was the first editor of the Law Quarterly Review which was founded in 1885. He was also, in 1894, the Chairman of The Society of Authors He was sworn of the Privy Council in 1911. He was elected Treasurer of Lincoln's Inn in 1931.

Family
Pollock married on 13 August 1873 to Georgina Harriet Deffell (died on 30 March 1935), a daughter of John Deffell.  They had two children:
Alice Isabella Pollock, born on 15 June 1876, died on 28 June 1953. Married first at St Marylebone Parish Church in London on 19 November 1902 to Sydney Waterlow (1878–1944), a diplomat and grandson of Sir Sydney Waterlow, 1st Baronet. This marriage was annulled in 1912, and she re-married the same year Captain Orlando Cyprian Williams, MC, CB (d.1967).
Frederick John Pollock (1878–1963), a noted historian, who succeeded to the baronetcy.

Fencing 
Together with his younger brother, Walter Herries Pollock, he participated in the first English revival of historical fencing, originated by Alfred Hutton and his colleagues Egerton Castle, Captain Carl Thimm, Colonel Cyril Matthey, Captain Percy Rolt, Captain Ernest George Stenson Cooke, Captain Frank Herbert Whittow. 

He was cited in a 1897 slander case involving the London Fencing Club when Sir John Hutton was sued by a French naval officer, Rene Martin Fortris, who accused Hutton of falsely stating that Fortris had been making unwelcome advances towards his daughter for two years. According to Fortris this led to Sir Frederick Pollock and John Norbury declining his application for membership of the London Fencing Club. The jury was unimpressed by Fortris's case and found in favour of Sir John Hutton.

Works
 ; 9th edition, 1921.
 A Digest of the Law of Partnership. F.H. Thomas and Company, St. Louis, 1878
 
 ; 2nd edition, 1892
  volume II
 
 

 ; volume II 
  
 ; 4th edition, 1918

See also 
 Alfred Hutton
 HEMA

References

External links 

Works by Sir Frederick Pollock: at Online Library of Liberty
 
 

1845 births
1937 deaths
Anglo-Saxon studies scholars
Alumni of Trinity College, Cambridge
Professors of Jurisprudence (University of Oxford)
Members of the Privy Council of the United Kingdom
Legal historians
Baronets in the Baronetage of the United Kingdom
People educated at Eton College
Members of Lincoln's Inn
English King's Counsel
Academics of the University of Oxford
English legal scholars
Fellows of the British Academy
Spinoza scholars